The 1990 Los Angeles Rams season was the team's 53rd year with the National Football League and 45th season in Los Angeles. On November 11, 1990, Marcus Dupree made his NFL debut against the New York Giants. The Rams, temporarily playing in the Los Angeles Memorial Coliseum, looked to improve on their 11–5 season from 1989 and make the playoffs for the third consecutive season and be possible contenders for the Super Bowl. However, the Rams would struggle all season, starting 1–4 before winning two of their next three games before losing their next two as they dipped to a 3–7 record. After a win over Cleveland, the Rams upset the 49ers 28–17 in San Francisco to improve to 5–7. However, this would be perhaps the only good highlight of the season for the Rams. After defeating the 49ers, they ended the season on a 4 game losing streak and finished with a disappointing 5–11 record, missing the playoffs for the first time since 1987 and only the fourth time since 1972.

Offseason

NFL Draft

Personnel

Staff

Roster

Regular season

Schedule

Standings

See also 
Other Anaheim–based teams in 1990
 California Angels (Anaheim Stadium)
 1990 California Angels season

External links 
 1990 Los Angeles Rams at Pro-Football-Reference.com

References 

Los Angeles Rams
Los Angeles Rams seasons
Los Ang